is a  Japanese former  football player. He last played for Kataller Toyama.

Career
After a solid career, mostly spent in J3 League, Tanaka retired due to injuries in 2020.

Club statistics
Updated to 23 February 2020.

Honours
 Blaublitz Akita
 J3 League (1): 2017

References

External links

Profile at Gifu
Profile at Tottori
Profile at Blaublitz Akita

1991 births
Living people
Fukuoka University alumni
Association football people from Fukuoka Prefecture
Japanese footballers
J2 League players
J3 League players
FC Gifu players
Gainare Tottori players
Blaublitz Akita players
Kataller Toyama players
Association football forwards